Lakeview Heights is an unincorporated community in Benton County, Missouri, United States.

A post office called Lakeview Heights was established in 1932, and remained in operation until 1955. The community was named for its location near Lake of the Ozarks.

References

Unincorporated communities in Benton County, Missouri
Unincorporated communities in Missouri